Nuisance Bear is a Canadian short documentary film, directed by Jack Weisman and Gabriela Osio Vanden and released in 2021. The film is a portrait of the polar bears in and around the town of Churchill, Manitoba.

Awards 
The film had its world premiere at the 2021 Toronto International Film Festival, where it received an honorable mention from the jury for the Best Canadian Short Film award. The film subsequently screened at True/False Film Festival 2022 and SXSW Film Festival 2022.

Nuisance Bear received a Canadian Screen Award nomination for Best Short Documentary at the 10th Canadian Screen Awards in 2022.

References

External links

2021 films
2021 short documentary films
Canadian short documentary films
Films shot in Manitoba
2020s Canadian films